The Lying Valet is a British play by David Garrick. A farce, it was first performed at the Goodman's Fields Theatre on 30 November 1741. Garrick based his work on the second act of All Without Money by Peter Antony Motteux, which was in turn inspired by a French play. Garrick initially followed the plots of the earlier plays quite closely, but the work soon diverges significantly. It was the only one of Garrick's plays which was completely sentimental in nature.

References

Bibliography
 Nettleton, George H. & Case, Arthur E. British Dramatists from Dryden to Sheridan. Southern Illinois University Press, 1975.
 Stein, Elizabeth. David Garrick, Dramatist. The Modern Language Association of America, 1937.

Plays by David Garrick
1741 plays